Concerto in E-flat, inscribed Dumbarton Oaks, 8.v.38 (1937–38) is a chamber concerto by Igor Stravinsky, named for the Dumbarton Oaks estate of Robert Woods Bliss and Mildred Barnes Bliss in Washington, D.C., who commissioned it for their thirtieth wedding anniversary. Composed in Stravinsky's neoclassical period, the piece is one of Stravinsky's two chamber concertos (the other being the Concerto in D, for strings, 1946) and is scored for a chamber orchestra of flute, B clarinet, bassoon, two horns, three violins, three violas, two cellos, and two double basses. The three movements, Tempo giusto, Allegretto, and Con moto, performed without a break, total roughly twelve minutes. The concerto was heavily inspired by Bach's set of Brandenburg Concertos, and was the last work Stravinsky completed in Europe, started in spring 1937 at the Château de Montoux near Annemasse, near Geneva, Switzerland, and finished in Paris on March 29, 1938.

The commission had been brokered by Nadia Boulanger. She also conducted the May 8, 1938, private premiere in the music room at Dumbarton Oaks, while the composer was hospitalized with tuberculosis. The public premiere took place in Paris on June 4, 1938, at a concert of La Sérénade, with Stravinsky conducting. The full-score manuscript, formerly owned by Mr. and Mrs. Robert Woods Bliss, is in the Harvard University Rare Book Collection of the Dumbarton Oaks Research Library, Washington, D.C.

Stravinsky himself created a reduction for two pianos. Leif Thybo's 1952 transcription for organ laid the foundation for his investigation of the possibilities of the modern form of the instrument. A ballet, choreographed by Jerome Robbins, was premiered by the New York City Ballet on June 23, 1972, calling for one principal and six corps dancers of each sex.

Sources

Sources

Further reading
Rogers, Lynne. 1992. "Dissociation in Stravinsky's Russian and Neoclassical Music". International Journal of Musicology 1:201–228.
Straus, Joseph. 1982. "Stravinsky's 'Tonal Axis'". Journal of Music Theory 26, no. 2 (Autumn): 261–90.

External links
 
Ledbetter, Steven. 1995. "Igor Stravinsky: Concerto in E-flat for chamber orchestra 'Dumbarton Oaks, 8.v.38'". Pro Arte website (archive from 12 March 2007, accessed 16 September 2011).
Strugnell, Stephen. [2007]. "Stravinsky – Concerto in E flat 'Dumbarton Oaks' (12')". Scottish Chamber Orchestra website (archive from 28 September 2007, accessed 16 September 2011).
 Work details, Schott Music
 , United States Marine Band, Jason Fettig (conductor), March 2021 – Program notes
 , Northern Chamber Orchestra, Nicholas Ward (conductor)

Concertos by Igor Stravinsky
1938 compositions
Stravinsky
Compositions in E-flat major
Music dedicated to benefactors or patrons